Matisse Samoise (born 21 November 2001) is a Belgian professional footballer who plays as a midfielder for Belgian side Gent.

Career
Samoise began his career in Gent's youth setup. On 29 September 2020, he made his senior debut under the guidance of manager Wim De Decker during the Champions League qualifying game against Dynamo Kyiv, in which he replaced Laurent Depoitre in the 74th minute. A day later, he signed a new contract at Gent until 2022, with the option of an extra year. Later that week, on 4 October, he scored his first goal as a professional player during his first professional senior match.

He made his first start on 3 February 2021 in the cup game against KFC Heur-Tongeren, scoring a goal and providing an assist.

Career statistics

References

External links
 
 UEFA profile

2001 births
Living people
Belgian footballers
Association football midfielders
K.A.A. Gent players
Belgian Pro League players